Sunny Edwards (born 1 January 1996) is a British professional boxer who has held the IBF flyweight title since 2021. He is the younger brother of former flyweight world champion of boxing, Charlie Edwards.

As of February 2023, he is ranked as the world's second best active flyweight by BoxRec, TBRB, The Ring, and ESPN.

Amateur career
As an amateur he fought out of Repton ABC and later Steel City ABC, winning multiple national championships; the ABA Juniors in 2013; ABA Youth in 2014; and the ABA Elite in 2015. He also won silver medals in the GB Junior, and ABA Elite Championships in 2012 and 2016 respectively.

Professional career

Early career
Edwards made his professional debut on 24 September 2016 at the Recinto Ferial in Estepona, Spain, scoring a four-round points decision (PTS) victory over Sergey Tasimov.

After winning his first five fights, one by stoppage, he faced undefeated prospect Ross Murray (6–0, 1 KO) on 27 November 2017 at Grange St. Paul's Hotel in London, with the vacant WBO European super-flyweight title on the line. Edwards won the fight via fourth-round technical knockout (TKO). Following two more wins, he successfully defended his WBO European title on 26 October 2018 with a ten round unanimous decision (UD) victory over Ryan Farrag at the York Hall, London. Two judges scored the bout 100–90 while the third scored it 99–91.

His next fight came on 15 December against Junior Granados at the Brentwood Centre, Essex, for the vacant WBO International super-flyweight title. Edwards overcame a second-round knockdown to add the WBO International to his WBO European title by UD, with the judges' scorecards reading 99–91, 98–91, 97–92. Following the win over Granados, he made a second defence of his WBO European title against Pedro Matos on 27 April 2019, at Wembley Arena, London. Edwards retained his title via eighth-round TKO. His next fight came on 13 July against Hiram Gallardo at The O2 Arena, London, with the vacant IBF International super-flyweight title in the line. Edwards won by UD, adding the IBF International to his WBO titles. All three judges scored the bout 99–90.

Edwards dropped down to flyweight for his next fight, stating, "We dropped down to flyweight because it's looking like I'm more likely to get a world title shot, but it is what it is". On 14 September 2019, he fought Rosendo Guarneros at the York Hall for the vacant IBF International and vacant WBO Inter-Continental flyweight titles. Edwards won by UD, with two judges scoring the bout 99–91 and the third scoring it 100–90.

Edwards fought Marcel Braithwaite on 21 December 2019, for the vacant British super-flyweight title. He won the fight by UD with scores of 117–110, 118–109 and 118–109. Edwards suffered the only knockdown of the fight, as he was knocked down by Braithwaite in the seventh round. Edwards revealed significant swelling on the knuckles of his hands post-fight, which were the result of damaged ligaments. Edwards defended his IBF International on 29 August 2020, defeating Thomas Essomba via UD with scores of 117–112, 117–111, and 116–112.

IBF flyweight champion

Edwards vs. Mthalane
Edwards challenged reigning champion Moruti Mthalane for the IBF flyweight title on 30 April 2021. Mthalane came into the fight on a sixteen-fight winning streak, with 13 of those fights being world title bouts. Mthalane's last loss came at the hands of Nonito Donaire on 1 November 2008. Edwards was a slight betting underdog heading into the fight. Edwards won the fight by UD, with two of the judges giving him wide scorecards of 118–111 and 120–108, while the third judge scored it 115–113 for him.

Edwards vs. Mama
On 24 May 2021, Edwards was ordered to face the IBF mandatory challenger Jayson Mama. Mama was originally set to face Mthalane, before accepting step-aside money to allow Edwards to fight him. The bout was officially scheduled for 11 September 2021 at the Copper Box Arena in Hackney Wick, London. On September 8, Edwards withdrew from the fight with an ankle injury. Accordingly, the title bout was postponed. The fight was rescheduled for 11 December 2021 and took place at the Coca-Cola Arena in Dubai, United Arab Emirates. After John Riel Casimero withdrew from his mandatory title defense against Paul Butler, Edwards' bout with Mama was elevated to main event status. Edwards won the fight by unanimous decision, with scores of 118-109, 118-109 and 117-110. He scored the sole knockdown of the fight in the tenth round, dropping Mama with a left-right combination.

Edwards vs. Waseem
On 25 January 2022, Edwards' promoters MTK Global announced that he would make the second defense of his title against the one-time IBF title challenger Muhammad Waseem, who was at the time the #3 ranked IBF flyweight contender. The fight was booked for 23 March 2022, and took place at the Aviation Club Tennis Centre in Dubai, United Arab Emirates. Two weeks later, on 9 February, Edwards signed a promotional deal with Probellum. Edwards won the fight by unanimous decision. Two of the judges scored the bout 115–111 in his favour, while the third judge awarded him a 116–110 scorecard. Waseem was deducted a point in both the sixth round for holding and a point in the seventh round for headbutting. Edwards called for a title unification bout with Julio Cesar Martinez in his post-fight interview, stating: "I want The Ring Magazine [title], I want the WBC [title]".

Edwards vs. Alvarado
On July 12, 2022, it was revealed that Edwards had entered into negotiations for a title unification bout with the WBC flyweight champion Julio Cesar Martinez. The IBF gave Edwards until September 7 to deliver signed contracts as proof of the unification bout taking place. As this failed to happen, on September 8, the IBF ordered Edwards to make a mandatory title defense against their former light flyweight champion Felix Alvarado. The title bout was booked to take place on November 11, in London, England. Edwards won the fight by unanimous decision. Two judges scored the bout 115–113 in his favor, while the third judge awarded him a 116–112 scorecard.

Professional boxing record

See also
List of world flyweight boxing champions
List of British world boxing champions

References

External links

|-

|-

|-

|-

|-

|-

1996 births
Living people
English male boxers
Boxers from Greater London
People from Sutton, London
Flyweight boxers
Super-flyweight boxers
World flyweight boxing champions
England Boxing champions
British Boxing Board of Control champions
International Boxing Federation champions